The Ashura (also known as MIG-G-0800) is a class of fast patrol boat used by naval forces of Iran. It is a Boston Whaler type vessel based on a Watercraft UK design, and is manufactured domestically with hulls made of glass-reinforced plastic.

Types 
Ashura speedboats are able to carry various guns, including heavy machine guns and multiple rocket launchers. There are versions with installed ZU-23-2 autocannon, DShK machine gun, and modified to carry a single naval mine.

Export 
From 1992 to 1994, Sudan purchased at least seven Ashura boats from Iran.

References 

Fast patrol boat classes of the Navy of the Islamic Revolutionary Guard Corps
Ship classes of the Islamic Republic of Iran Navy
Ships built by Marine Industries Organization